Carolus Polodig, O.C.D. (1671–1714) was a Roman Catholic prelate who served as Vicar Apostolic of Izmir (1713–1714) and Titular Archbishop of Cyrrhus (1713–1714).

Biography
Carolus Polodig was born in Svitavy on 29 October 1671 and ordained a priest in the Order of Discalced Carmelites.
On 23 December 1713, he was appointed during the papacy of Pope Clement XI as Vicar Apostolic of Izmir and Titular Archbishop of Cyrrhus.
On 28 January 1714, he was consecrated bishop by Francesco Acquaviva d'Aragona, Cardinal-Priest of Santa Cecilia, and Giovanni Francesco Nicolai, Titular Bishop of Berytus, and Silvius de Cavalieri, Titular Archbishop of Athenae, serving as co-consecrators. 
He served as Vicar Apostolic of Izmir  until his death on 7 July 1714.

References 

18th-century Roman Catholic bishops in the Ottoman Empire
Bishops appointed by Pope Clement XI
1671 births
1714 deaths
Discalced Carmelite bishops